Grzegorz Bonin (born 2 December 1983) is a Polish professional footballer who plays as a winger.

Career
In January 2013, he joined Górnik Zabrze. On 18 July 2018, he signed a contract with Motor Lublin. Bonin has made one appearance for the Poland national team on 2 May 2006 in a 0–1 loss against Lithuania.

References

External links
 
 

1983 births
Living people
Polish footballers
Poland international footballers
People from Tczew County
Sportspeople from Pomeranian Voivodeship
Association football midfielders
Korona Kielce players
Radomiak Radom players
Górnik Zabrze players
Polonia Warsaw players
ŁKS Łódź players
Pogoń Szczecin players
Górnik Łęczna players
Motor Lublin players
KS Lublinianka players
Chełmianka Chełm players
Ekstraklasa players
I liga players
III liga players